Emilio Carrere (Madrid, 18 December 1881 – Madrid, 30 April 1947) was a Spanish writer. He is best known for his 1920 gothic historical novel La torre de los siete jorobados (Eng: The Tower of the Seven Hunchbacks). In 1944, this was the basis for the film, La torre de los siete jorobados, directed by Edgar Neville.

Works

Poetry
 Románticas (1902)
 El caballero de la muerte (1909)
 Del amor, del dolor y del misterio (1915)
 Dietario sentimental (1916)
 Nocturnos de otoño (1920)
 Los ojos de los fantasmas (1920, second edition, Buenos Aires, 1924)
 Ruta emocional de Madrid (1935)

Prose
 La cofradía de la pirueta (1912)
 Rosas de meretricio (1917)
 La copa de Verlaine (1918)
 Aventuras extraordinarias de Garcín de Tudela (1919)
 La torre de los siete jorobados (Eng: The Tower of the Seven Hunchbacks) (1920)
 El sacrificio (1922)
 La Amazona (1923)
 La cortesana de las cruces (1925)
 La calavera de Atahualpa (1934)

References

Bibliography
 Hardy, Phil & Milne, Tom. Horror. Aurum Press, 1996.

External links
 

1881 births
1947 deaths
People from Madrid
Spanish male writers